The 1879 Penn Quakers football team represented the University of Pennsylvania in the 1879 college football season. They finished with a 2–2 record.

Schedule

References

Penn
Penn Quakers football seasons
Penn Quakers football